Kyle A. Plott (born March 8, 1996) is an American professional stock car racing driver. He last competed part-time in the NASCAR Gander Outdoors Truck Series, driving the No. 34 Toyota Tundra for Reaume Brothers Racing.

Racing career
Plott began racing at an early age, doing so in legend cars.

He spent the 2018 racing season in the Southern Super Series and CARS Tour. In August and September, he scored his first wins in the two series at Watermelon Capital Speedway and Orange County Speedway, respectively.

In November 2019, Plott joined Reaume Brothers Racing for his NASCAR Gander Outdoors Truck Series debut in the Lucas Oil 150 at ISM Raceway.

Personal life
His younger brother Kason is also a racing driver.

Motorsports career results

NASCAR
(key) (Bold – Pole position awarded by qualifying time. Italics – Pole position earned by points standings or practice time. * – Most laps led.)

Gander Outdoors Truck Series

ARCA Racing Series
(key) (Bold – Pole position awarded by qualifying time. Italics – Pole position earned by points standings or practice time. * – Most laps led.)

 Season still in progress
 Ineligible for series points

References

External links
 

1996 births
NASCAR drivers
ARCA Menards Series drivers
People from Marietta, Georgia
Living people
CARS Tour drivers
Racing drivers from Atlanta
Racing drivers from Georgia (U.S. state)